Yazykovo is a rural locality (a village) in Novonadezhdinsky Selsoviet, Blagoveshchensky District, Bashkortostan, Russia. The population was 195 as of 2010. There are 2 streets.

Geography 
Yazykovo is located 120 km southwest of Blagoveshchensk (the district's administrative centre) by road. Kob-Pokrovka is the nearest rural locality.

References 

Rural localities in Blagoveshchensky District